Ishar 3: The Seven Gates of Infinity is a 1994 role-playing video game developed and published by Silmarils. It is part of the Ishar series of games, and a sequel to Ishar 2: Messengers of Doom.

Gameplay
The player takes the role of Zubaran (or imports a party of characters from another game in the series), and is tasked with hunting the dragon Sith. To this end, the player must cross a series of gates that lead to different time periods. Each period, like the islands of Ishar 2, has its own climate and type of landscape.

Release 
A 3DO Interactive Multiplayer version was announced but never released. Cyril Cogordan, a former Silmarils programmer, has stated in an interview and on his personal website that a conversion of Ishar 3 was in development for the Atari Jaguar CD, based upon the CD-ROM version released for the Atari Falcon. Despite being completed and sent to Atari Corporation for approval, it was never released due to Atari Corp. closing their doors as a result of the commercial and critical failure of the Atari Jaguar platform.

Reception

Reviewing Ishar 3 for PC Gamer US, William R. Trotter wrote, "Hardcore FRPG fans will probably like it—novices will find it tedious, overwhelming, and frustrating." He called the graphics "often breathtakingly beautiful" and "as richly textured as oil paintings", but found the game's reliance on backtracking dull and disliked the high speed of combat.

In CU Amiga, Toby Dillon called Ishar 3 "almost the perfect RPG." He concluded, "All of the right elements from the last two games have been kept, the plot has been improved and the game looks simply incredible." Tina Hackett of Amiga Computing called Ishar 3 "one of the most absorbing and atmospheric adventures around", despite her minor criticisms of its sound. She praised its depth of content and characterization, and considered it "a superb addition to the Ishar series".

Next Generation reviewed the PC version of the game, rating it two stars out of five, and stated that "This is Bard's Tale all over again."

Notes

References

External links 
 Ishar 3: The Seven Gates of Infinity at GameFAQs
 Ishar 3: The Seven Gates of Infinity at Giant Bomb
 Ishar 3: The Seven Gates of Infinity at MobyGames

1994 video games
Amiga games
Atari ST games
Cancelled 3DO Interactive Multiplayer games
Cancelled Atari Jaguar games
DOS games
Fantasy video games
Classic Mac OS games
ReadySoft Incorporated games
Role-playing video games
Silmarils (company) games
Single-player video games
Video games developed in France
Video games scored by Fabrice Hautecloque
Windows games